The 52nd annual Venice International Film Festival was held between 30 August and 9 September 1995.

Jury
The following people comprised the 1995 jury:
 Jorge Semprún (head of jury)
 Guglielmo Biraghi (former head of the festival)
 Jean-Pierre Jeunet
 Abbas Kiarostami
 Margarethe von Trotta
 Mario Martone
 Peter Rainer (film critic)
 Moses Rothman

Official selection
sources:

In competition

Out of competition
Mighty Aphrodite by Woody Allen (United States)
Beyond the Clouds by Michelangelo Antonioni, Wim Wenders (Italy/ France)
The Journey of August King by John Duigan (United States)

Venetian Nights 

Strange Days by  Kathryn Bigelow  (Usa)
Black Holes by Pappi Corsicato  (Italy)
The Day of the Beast by  Álex de la Iglesia  (Spain)
Jade  by  William Friedkin  (Usa)
Braveheart by Mel Gibson (Usa/Australia)
Dolores Claiborne by  Taylor Hackford  (Usa)
Apollo 13 by  Ron Howard  (Usa)
Waterworld by  Kevin Reynolds  (Usa)
Wild Horses by  Marcelo Piñeyro  (Spain)
French Twist by  Josiane Balasko (France)

Window on Images

The Doom Generation by  Gregg Araki  (Usa)
Carlota Joaquina, Princess of Brazil di Carla Camurati  (Brasil)
Lo zio di Brooklyn by  Ciprì & Maresco  (Italy)
Stonewall   by Nigel Finch  (Usa/UK)
Mee Pok Man by  Eric Khoo  (Singapore)
Dezesseis zero sessenta by  Vinicius Mainardi (Brasil) 
En avoir (ou pas) by Laetitia Masson   (France)
Peculiarities of the National Hunt by Aleksandr Rogozhkin  (Russia) 
Guiltrip  by Gerard Stembridge (Ireland)
The Pillow Book (Work in progress) by Peter Greenaway (UK) 
Flamenco by Carlos Saura  (Spain)

Overtaking Lane

Fiesta by Pierre Boutron  (France) 
I.D. by Philip Davis   (UK) 
Antarctica by Manuel Huerga   (Spain) 
Musulmanin by Vladimir Khotinenko   (Russia) 
Rough Magic by Clare Peploe (UK/France) 
Il verificatore by Stefano Incerti  (Italy)

Italian Panorama 

Bidoni by  Felice Farina  (Italy)
Io e il re by  Lucio Gaudino  (Italy)
Bits and Pieces by Antonello Grimaldi  (Italy)
Vindravan Film Studios by Lamberto Lambertini  (Italy)
Bandidos by  Stefano Mignucci  (Italy)
La casa rosa by  Vanna Paoli  (Italy)
Marciando nel buio by  Massimo Spano  (Italy)
Palermo - Milan One Way by  Claudio Fragasso  (Italy)

Documentaries 

12 novembre by Autori Vari (Italy)  
La línea paterna by Josè Buil, Marisa Sistach  (Mexico)
Unzipped  by Douglas Keeve (Usa) 
Ecce Homo by Vesna Ljubic Sayariy (Bosnia)  
’75 by  Mela Marquez (Bolivia/Italy)
War Stories  by Gaylene Preston, El Abuelo Cheno  (New Zealand)
...y otras historias by Juan Carlos Rulfo  (Mexico) 
The Wandering Paddlers / Pao-Jiang-Hu by Mitsuo Yanagimachi  (Japan)

Awards

 Golden Lion:
 Xich lo by Anh Hung Tran
Grand Special Jury Prize:
 A Comédia de Deus by João César Monteiro
 L'uomo delle stelle by Giuseppe Tornatore
Golden Osella:
Best Director - Kenneth Branagh for In the Bleak Midwinter
Best Cinematography - Masao Nakabori for Maborosi
Best Screenplay - Abolfazl Jalili for Det Yani Dokhtar
Volpi Cup:
Best Actor - Götz George for The Deathmaker
Best Actress - Sandrine Bonnaire & Isabelle Huppert for La Cérémonie
Best Supporting Performer - Ian Hart for Nothing Personal
Best Supporting Performer - Isabella Ferrari for Romanzo di un giovane povero
The President of the Italian Senate's Gold Medal:
Marco Tullio Giordana for Pasolini, un delitto italiano
Career Golden Lion:
Woody Allen
Alain Resnais
Martin Scorsese
Ennio Morricone
Alberto Sordi
Monica Vitti
Goffredo Lombardo
Giuseppe De Santis
FIPRESCI Prize:
Xich lo by Anh Hung Tran
Beyond the Clouds by Michelangelo Antonioni & Wim Wenders
OCIC Award - Honorable Mention:
Hirokazu Koreeda for Maborosi
Pasinetti Award:
Best Film - A Comédia de Deus by João César Monteiro
Best Actor - Sergio Castellitto for L'uomo delle stelle
Best Actress - Sandrine Bonnaire & Isabelle Huppert for La Cérémonie
Pietro Bianchi Award:
Giuseppe Rotunno
Luigi Magni
Elvira Notari Prize - Special Mention:
Márta Mészáros & Maia Morgenstern for The Seventh Room
AIACE Award:
Carlo Sigon for Ketchup

References

External links 

Venice Film Festival 1995 Awards on IMDb

Venice
V
Venice Film Festival
Film
Venice
August 1995 events in Europe
September 1995 events in Europe